Foosball (also known as Underdogs in the United States and The Unbeatables in the United Kingdom) is a 2013 computer-animated comedy film co-written, produced, directed and edited by Juan J. Campanella. The film is loosely based on the short story Memorias de un wing derecho (Memoirs of a Right Winger) by Argentine writer Roberto Fontanarrosa. Gaston Gorali, co-writer and producer of the film, and Eduardo Sacheri (who had previously worked with Campanella for the classic film The Secret in Their Eyes) developed the screenplay with Campanella.

The film is an Argentine production, and was released by Universal Pictures International Entertainment in Argentina on 18 July 2013, setting an all-time record for an Argentine film opening at the box-office. Costing $21 million, the film is the most expensive Argentine film of all time, and the most expensive Latin American animated feature ever. In 2014, The Weinstein Company acquired the rights to distribute the film in North America. After numerous delays, including an August 2015 theatrical release that was scrapped last minute, the North American English-language version was released on DVD in July 2016. The film was available on Netflix in the United States in June 2016.

The film received mixed reviews upon its international release; it has a 67% approval rating on Rotten Tomatoes based on 14 reviews, while scoring a 38% weighted average score on Metacritic, indicating "generally unfavorable reviews".

In the American version, the film features the voices of Ariana Grande, Nicholas Hoult, Matthew Morrison, Eugenio Derbez, Taran Killam, Shawn Mendes, Katie Holmes, Brooklyn Beckham, Bobby Moynihan, Bella Thorne, John Leguizamo, and Mel Brooks. Whereas, the UK version features the voices of Rupert Grint, Ralf Little, Anthony Head, Rob Brydon, Peter Serafinowicz and Darren Boyd.

Plot
A father who is putting his son to sleep narrates him a story, beginning by telling him to use his imagination while listening.

Many years ago, Amadeo, a timid boy and the best foosball player around, was working in a bar in a small and quiet town. He loved Laura, a girl he met in the bar, but she did not know. While showing Laura the foosball table, a bully named Grosso arrives and challenges Amadeo to a game in front of Laura. Although Amadeo refuses to play at first, he is victorious, and everyone at the bar applauds. Outside of the bar, Grosso encounters a manager who offers to take him on.

Seven years later, Amadeo's simple routine falls apart when Grosso becomes the best football player in the world, and returns to the small town to avenge the only defeat in his life. Now that he is famous, Grosso announces that he has purchased the whole village (as the town's mayor escapes in a helicopter), and builds a gigantic football stadium, although he is more interested in owning the foosball table where he lost to Amadeo and destroying the bar where he was defeated. He also wants to win the affection of Laura.

With football, the bar and even his soul destroyed, Amadeo discovers something magical: in the face of adversity, the town's foosball players talk and plan. Together they embark on a journey full of adventures to save Laura. Along the way, they become a real team, and while Grosso turns the town into a giant stadium and forms a soccer team, Amadeo recruits members of his foosball team along with those of his own, and also forms a soccer team to challenge Grosso for their town.

At the game, Grosso's team takes the early lead, but the foosball players help Amadeo's team to tie the game. However, with seconds to go, Grosso deliberately injures Amadeo, who is unable to stop him from scoring the winning goal. As Grosso gloats and celebrates his victory, the crowd instead praises Amadeo's good sportsmanship, and Grosso is rejected by his fans for his selfishness and his manager abandons him while his teammates also congratulate Amadeo, who reunites with Laura in the end. Amadeo, Laura, and their friends build a new town in honor of them.

The father, Amadeo, finishes his story and leaves his son's bedroom, but he remains awake and hears voices well into the night. Going outside to the shed to investigate, he finds Amadeo and the foosball players conversing at the foosball table. Heartened by this, he joins them.

Cast

Additional voices

Production
The film was announced on 27 November 2009. The voices of the main characters of the cast are Pablo Rago, Miguel Ángel Rodríguez, Fabian Gianola, Horacio Fontova and David Masajnik.

Sergio Pablos, executive producer and creator of the original idea and story for Despicable Me, acted as animation director for 20 minutes of the film, and advised Campanella on direction. The rest of the film was animated under the directions of Federico Radero and Mario Serie.

Puerto Rican band Calle 13 composed and performed the original song of the movie.

Release
An English-language version of the film was produced in the United Kingdom by 369 Productions with Vertigo Films handling the distribution rights and was released under the name The Unbeatables on 15 August 2014. The UK dub features stars such as Rupert Grint, Rob Brydon, Anthony Head, Ralf Little, Alistair McGowan, Peter Serafinowicz, and Eve Ponsonby.

In March 2014, The Weinstein Company acquired distribution rights for the film in the United States, Canada, Australia, New Zealand and France, with plans to release their own heavily edited English-language version of the film under the title Underdogs. The US dub features Ariana Grande, Nicholas Hoult, Matthew Morrison, Katie Holmes, John Leguizamo, Eugenio Derbez, Taran Killam, Bobby Moynihan, Chazz Palminteri, and Mel Brooks. The film was originally going to be released on August 27, 2014 but was pushed back several times. A week before a planned August 14, 2015 release, the film was pulled from the schedule. It was released direct-to-video on 19 July 2016.

Changes made to the UK dub
The victory song that Skip (Capi), Ziggy (Loco), and Rico (Beto) were singing was replaced by "Olé! Olé! Olé!".
The UK dub cuts out the scene where Loco begins meditating, and Beto imitates an ambulance in front of Capi.
The scenes with Skip rescuing the Mustachio Twins (Malparitti Brothers) and Rico on the puppet show are arranged differently from the original version. Each were cut in probably three parts to interrupt one or another.
There are two announcers instead of one in The Unbeatables, known as commentators Ray and Bob. This makes it similar to a Premier League soccer match in real life.
There are a few scenes of the original version that are translated in English, take for instance, Amadeo holding a sign that says "Elsie's Lingerie-supporting the team".
The credits has a short instrumental version of "Me vieron cruzar", and an original, lengthy version of "Olé! Olé! Olé!".

Changes made to the US dub
The US dub has a lot of added ad-ibbing, thanks to the Weinstein Company licensing it. Take for instance the narrator was added in the beginning of the movie.
Many scenes were cut and/or re-arranged by the Weinstein Company, making the plot squashed in remorse. This also includes the scenes of Hormona Dominguez (or Nanna/"Bob") participating in the soccer field, while her breasts jiggle, and the scene where she takes off her jersey; this avoids slight sexual content, unlike the original and the UK version.
Laura tells Jake she'll study in a Art School, instead of go to Europe.
The beginning credits has score music, unlike the previous two versions.
After the soccer montage of the figures, a subtle crossfading record scratch was heard.
This dub spoils Matty's parents' identities as Jake (Amadeo) and Laura at the beginning.
The dialogue changes to Matty speaking to his father that his mom needs him, instead of asking "What are you doing?". Another change is instead of harshly saying "No. Go to bed.", he said "Hey, you heard your mother. Off to bed."
Instead of the dialogue with the father having to try to be sensitive to Matty, Laura states that Matty quit the soccer, because of the lack of scoring a goal.
Lots of the foosball figures were stereotypically altered (minus Capi, Park-Lee, Igor, Cordobas, and the Malparitti Brothers). The Malparitti do have Italian accents, hence their surnames.
Ziggy (Loco) has a stereotypical hippie accent, and is written to be from California.
Rico (Beto) comes from Spain, because of his voice actor.
Captain Rip (Liso) has an Australian accent.
One of the Rippers has a southern accent.
Bruno (Pulpo) probably has a New York accent.
The Pinstripes and Garnets were renamed as Underdogs and Rippers.
The Emo character hums at the song, during the destruction of the cafe.
Some scenes include pop songs, instead of the original score music. Take for example, Ace (Grosso) making his fancy entrance.
The US dub adds Rufus' relationship with Hormona Dominguez as his Nanna.
A song from the radio has been added, when the boss shouted that the employee is fixing the stadium wrong.
Like the UK dub, there are two announcers, instead of one.
The list of companies parodied by real-life companies were replaced by the anthem of Ace Remancho, additionally the lyrics.
The sign Jake holds was rewritten as "Uniforms by Laura #lauragotpizzazz", avoiding inappropriate sexual humor.
The sign of the statue has been translated.
Only the score version of "Me vieron cruzcar" is shown at the very end of the credits.

Reception

Critical reception
Based on 15 reviews on Rotten Tomatoes, the film received a positive rating of 67%, with an average rating of 5.64/10. On Metacritic, the film has a rating of 38 out of 100, based on 5 critics, indicating "generally unfavorable reviews".

Conversely, reception to the original Spanish version was far more positive, with review aggregator Todas las Críticas marking an average score of 71 out of 100.

Box office
The film opened #1 at the Argentine box-office, earning 16,622,178 pesos on its opening weekend, outperforming other animated blockbusters such as Despicable Me 2 and Monsters University.

References

External links
 
 
 Underdogs at Metacritic
 
 
 

2013 films
2010s Spanish-language films
2013 3D films
2013 computer-animated films
2010s adventure comedy films
2010s fantasy comedy films
Argentine animated films
Argentine adventure comedy films
Argentine children's films
Argentine comedy films
Argentine fantasy films
Argentine association football films
Animated comedy films
2010s children's comedy films
2010s children's animated films
Films directed by Juan José Campanella
The Weinstein Company films
The Weinstein Company animated films
Universal Pictures films
Universal Pictures animated films
3D animated films
2013 comedy films
2010s American films
2010s Argentine films
Alternative versions of films
Spanish computer-animated films
2010s Spanish films
Atresmedia Cine films